Bhanjanagar is a Vidhan Sabha constituency of Ganjam district.
Area of this constituency includes Bhanjanagar, Bhanjanagar block and Jagannathaprasad block.

Elected Members

14 elections held during 1957 to 2014. List of members elected from this constituency are:
2014: (123): Bikrama Keshari Arukha (BJD) 
2009: (123): Bikrama Keshari Arukha (BJD) 
2004: (66): Bikrama Keshari Arukha (BJD) 
2000: (66): Bikrama Keshari Arukha (BJD) 
1995: (66): Bikrama Keshari Arukha (JD) 
1990: (66): Ramakrushna Gauda (JD) 
1985: (66): Umakanta Mishra (Congress) 
1980: (66): Somanath Rath (Congress-I) 
1977: (66): Jami Subarao Prusty (Janata)
1974: (66): Somanath Rath (Congress) 
1971: (62): Somanath Rath (Jana Congress)
1967: (62): Dinabandhu Behera (Congress) 
1961: (25): Maguni Charana Pradhan (Congress) 
1957: (20): Suma Nayak (Communist) and Gobinda Pradhan (Communist)

2019 Election Result

2014 Election Result
In 2014 election,  Biju Janata Dal candidate Bikram Keshari Arukha defeated  Indian National Congress candidate Binayak Tripathy by a margin of 31,730 votes.

2009 Election Result
In last 2009 election Biju Janata Dal candidate Bikrama Keshari Arukh, defeated Indian National Congress candidate Debi Prasad Bisoyi by 73,367 votes.

*: %of total valid votes

References

Assembly constituencies of Odisha
Politics of Ganjam district